Polish Oriental Society a society of Polish orientalists. Founded in 1922. Currently 131 members. Its statutory aims are: to contribute to the development of oriental studies in Poland through research and support of research on peoples of Asia and Africa. President: Marek Mejor.

Address:  00-927 Warszawa, ul. Krakowskie Przedmieście 26/28 (Institute of Oriental Studies of the University of Warsaw)

External links
 https://web.archive.org/web/20060928080709/http://www.orient.uw.edu.pl/pto/index.html
 https://web.archive.org/web/20070209072132/http://bazy.opi.org.pl/raporty/opisy/instyt/14000/i14039.htm

Learned societies of Poland